The women's 5000 metres race of the 2014–15 ISU Speed Skating World Cup 2, arranged in the Taereung International Ice Rink, in Seoul, South Korea, was held on 21 November 2014.

Claudia Pechstein of Germany won, followed by Martina Sáblíková of the Czech Republic in second place, and Ivanie Blondin of Canada in third place. Olga Graf of Russia won Division B.

Results
The race took place on Friday, 21 November, with Division B scheduled in the morning session, at 10:45, and Division A scheduled in the afternoon session, at 15:00.

Division A

Division B

References

Women 5000
1
ISU